The Bunch-Walton Post No. 22 American Legion Hut is a historic social club meeting hall at  201 Legion Street in Clarksville, Arkansas.  It is architecturally unique in the community, built out of native stone in the manner of a Norman castle.  It is two stories in height, with rounded projecting corners and a crenellated parapet.  Its main entrance is set in a rounded-arch opening at the center of the front facade, and is elevated, with access via  flight of stairs.  It was built in 1934, and is believed to be the only American Legion hall of this style in the state.

The building was listed on the National Register of Historic Places in 2007.

See also
National Register of Historic Places listings in Johnson County, Arkansas

References

Clubhouses on the National Register of Historic Places in Arkansas
Cultural infrastructure completed in 1934
Buildings and structures in Johnson County, Arkansas
American Legion buildings
National Register of Historic Places in Johnson County, Arkansas
1934 establishments in Arkansas